Frison may refer to:

 Aleksander Frison (born 1875), a Ukrainian Roman Catholic bishop 
 Emile Frison, a Belgian plant pathologist, director general of Bioversity International (2003–2013)
 George Carr Frison (1924–2020), an American archaeologist
 Herman Frison (born 1961), a Belgian professional road bicycle racer
 Michaël Frison (born 1974), a Belgian writer and musician
 Mauro Frison (born 1984), an Argentinian drummer, resident of Sweden
 Alberto Frison (born 1988), an Italian goalkeeper
 Sara Frison (born 1989), Canadian voice actress

See also

 Frisson